Mustafa Osmanovich Belyalov (born 4 June 1957) also known as Mustafa Belyalov or Moustava Belialov is an Uzbekistan retired football player, who played as a defender.

Career
He spends his career mostly in his native Uzbekistan where he played for Pakhtakor in two stints, and Nuravshon Bukhara. He also played for clubs in the former Soviet League such as Neftchi Baku, Pamir Dushanbe and SKA Lviv. Towards the end of his career, he played in Malaysia for Perak FA.

He represented Uzbekistan national football team 7 times, all in 1992. Played for the Olympic Team of USSR in 1983.

Honors
3rd place in Uzbekistan Footballer of the Year 1992

References

External links
 KLISF
 
 

1957 births
Living people
People from Samarqand Region
Uzbekistani footballers
Uzbekistan international footballers
CSKA Pamir Dushanbe players
Pakhtakor Tashkent FK players
Perak F.C. players
SKA Lviv players
Association football defenders
Neftçi PFK players
Soviet footballers
Soviet Top League players
Uzbekistani expatriate footballers
Expatriate footballers in Malaysia
Uzbekistani expatriate sportspeople in Malaysia